Redland is a census-designated place in Elmore County, Alabama, United States. Its population was 3,736 as of the 2010 census.

Demographics

Education
It is in the Elmore County Public School System.

References

Census-designated places in Elmore County, Alabama
Census-designated places in Alabama